Chen Shiwei (born 2 August 1991) is a Chinese track and field sprint athlete who competes in the Men's 4x100m relay event. He is from Changle District, Fuzhou. Chen holds Chinese records and won the men's 4x100m relay at the 2014 Asian Games. Chen holds the Asian record of the 4x100m relay, 37.99 in Incheon.

References

1991 births
Living people
Runners from Fujian
Chinese male sprinters
Sportspeople from Fuzhou
Asian Games medalists in athletics (track and field)
Asian Games gold medalists for China
Medalists at the 2014 Asian Games
Athletes (track and field) at the 2014 Asian Games